Robert Borg (May 27, 1913 – April 5, 2005) was an American military officer and equestrian. He was born in Manila, Philippines. He placed fourth in individual dressage, and won a silver medal in team dressage at the 1948 Summer Olympics in London. He participated at the 1952 Summer Olympics in Helsinki, and at the 1956 Summer Olympics in Melbourne.

References

External links

1913 births
2005 deaths
People from Manila
American male equestrians
American dressage riders
Olympic bronze medalists for the United States in equestrian
Equestrians at the 1948 Summer Olympics
Equestrians at the 1952 Summer Olympics
Equestrians at the 1956 Summer Olympics
Medalists at the 1948 Summer Olympics
Olympic silver medalists for the United States in equestrian
Pan American Games medalists in equestrian
Pan American Games silver medalists for the United States
Equestrians at the 1955 Pan American Games
Medalists at the 1955 Pan American Games
American expatriates in the Philippines